Vallotton is a Swiss surname. Notable people with the surname include:
 Benjamin Vallotton (1877–1962),  Swiss writer and journalist
 Félix Vallotton (1865–1925), Swiss painter and engraver
 Frédéric Vallotton (born 1970),  Swiss writer
 Henry Vallotton (1891–1971),  Swiss writer and politician
 Jean-Pierre Vallotton (born 1955), Swiss writer
 Paul Vallotton (1919–2010), Swiss dramatist and writer

French-language surnames